ECHO, commonly known as ECHO Philippines, formerly as (AURA Philippines) is a Southeast Asian based esports team under the franchise of AURA Esports in Indonesia. Has competitive esports team in the game of Mobile Legends: Bang Bang.

Mobile Legends: Bang Bang

Mobile Legends Professional League

Bren No Limit 
In season 2, Echo Loud Aura Philippines or ECHO Philippines traces its roots back to the Digital Devils No Limit where later on acquired by Bren Esports to be rebrand as Bren No Limit

In season 3, They managed to finish 5th-6th Place in the Playoffs. Even though they're the sister team of Bren, they actually managed to beat by themselves.

Sunsparks 
In season 4, At this point, they acquired Renzio and Fuzaken while Chico and Vern left the team and rebranded to SunSparks but they're still the sister team of Bren. They claimed their first championship after a long fight against ONIC 3-2 and became a full-fledged MPL/PH powerhouse.

In season 5, Later on they swapped with their nemesis ONIC Philippines swapping "fuzaken" in exchange of "Greed_" and also they get "Killuash" from his previous team Arkangel the MPL-S3 winner together with Eski FLexx(Sky).  Afterall defeated by Bren Esports they still managed to defeat  ONIC Philippines and become the first team in MPL Philippines to become back to back champion.

Aura Philippines 
In season 6, AURA Esports from Indonesia acquired the whole roster and rebranded to AURA PH, thus they're not the sister team of Bren Esports anymore.  Despite a very good performance in the early and middle phases, They are the one also created the well known "Diggie Strat"  unorthodox strategy in MPL. Their performance is deteriorating in the last weeks of the Regular Season. Although in the playoffs they're expected to have a better performance, they're still ultimately eliminated by ONIC PH 3–0. Renzio and Kielvj left the team and was replaced by Hadess and Bennyqt.

In season 7 of MPL Philippine,s they still managed to get on the playoffs but still defeated by the Execration in 3-0 match in favour of Execration.

In season 8, their parent team AURA Esports allowed them to change their name to ECHO but still same management. Some changes were made in their rosters, letting go their former players Killuash, Jaypee and "Greed_" which he goes back to his former team ONIC Philippines as Baloyskie. Later on they announced their new players including KurtTzy. However, they were able to qualify for the playoffs but lost to Omega Esports in four games in the first round of the playoffs, 3 games to 1.

At the 2021 MPL Invitational, ECHO Philippines managed to survive in the tournament by defeating their main team AURA Esports in 2-1 match. In spite of that they were unable to continue their journey to the MPL Invitational after the 2-1 match against their countrymen RSG Philippines in a macrostrategy in the side lane

The team announced their latest roster for season 9, composed of M2 World Champion and MPL Season 6 champion Karl Gabriel "KarlTzy" Nepomuceno, along with returning two-time MPL champion Ashley Marco Cruz, better known as "Killuash", who took a break from last season. Echo Philippines get their tank user from Nexplay EVOS "Yawi" and 3martzy from TNC Pro Team-ML. ECHO Philippines began their MPL Philippines Season 9 series with a matchup against the M2 World Champions Bren Esports, the former team of ECHO's jungler Karltzy. ECHO finishes the first week of MPL Philippines Season 9 with a 2-0 standings alongside a 4-0 game win. During the week 4 of the MPL Philippines Season 9 the team had win 2-0 against the Nexplay EVOS by default match after the NXPE  failed to reach the game 15 minutes before the actual match due to heavy traffic and flat tire during travel, Nexplay EVOS issued a formal apology in MPL Philippines operations and the fans of the both teams. ECHO would eventually fall to the third seed, facing off against Smart Omega however, it would become another win for Omega from the previous season's rematch of a 3-0 result.

Seasons summary

MLBB Professional League : Philippines

Mobile Legends World Championships

Current roster

References 

Esports teams based in the Philippines
Mobile Legends: Bang Bang teams